The following is a list of films filmed using the VistaVision process. Titles in bold are black-and-white films.

Films shot entirely in VistaVision

Paramount

 White Christmas (1954)
 3 Ring Circus (1954)
 Artists and Models (1955)
 The Desperate Hours (1955) (first b&w film shot in VistaVision)
 The Far Horizons (1955)
 The Girl Rush (1955)
 Hell's Island (1955)
 Lucy Gallant (1955)
 The Rose Tattoo (1955)
 Run for Cover (1955)
 The Seven Little Foys (1955)
 Strategic Air Command (1955)
 To Catch a Thief (1955)
 The Trouble with Harry (1955)
 We're No Angels (1955)
 You're Never Too Young (1955)
 Anything Goes (1956)
 The Birds and the Bees (1956)
 The Court Jester (1956)
 Hollywood or Bust (1956)
 The Leather Saint (1956)
 The Man Who Knew Too Much (1956)
 The Mountain (1956)
 Pardners (1956)
 The Proud and Profane (1956)
 The Rainmaker (1956)
 The Scarlet Hour (1956)
 The Search for Bridey Murphy (1956)
 The Ten Commandments (1956)
 That Certain Feeling (1956)
 Three Violent People (1956)
 The Vagabond King (1956)
 War and Peace (1956)
 Beau James (1957)
 The Buster Keaton Story (1957)
 The Delicate Delinquent (1957)
 The Devil's Hairpin (1957)
 Fear Strikes Out (1957)
 Funny Face (1957)
 Gunfight at the O.K. Corral (1957)
 Hear Me Good (1957)
 The Joker Is Wild (1957)
 The Lonely Man (1957)
 Loving You (1957)
 Omar Khayyam (1957)
 The Sad Sack (1957)
 Short Cut to Hell (1957)
 Spanish Affair (1957)
 The Tin Star (1957)
 Wild Is the Wind (1957)
 Williamsburg: the Story of a Patriot (1957) (first documentary shot in VistaVision)
 Another Time, Another Place (1958)
 The Black Orchid (1958)
 The Buccaneer (1958)
 Desire Under the Elms (1958)
 The Geisha Boy (1958)
 Hot Spell (1958)
 Houseboat (1958)
 King Creole (1958)
 Maracaibo (1958)
 The Matchmaker (1958)
 Rock-a-Bye Baby (1958)
 St. Louis Blues (1958)
 Teacher's Pet (1958)
 Vertigo (1958)
 But Not for Me (1959)
 The Five Pennies (1959)
 The Jayhawkers! (1959)
 Last Train from Gun Hill (1959)
 Li'l Abner (1959)
 That Kind of Woman (1959)
 The Trap (1959)
 Heller in Pink Tights (1960)
 It Started in Naples (1960)
 One-Eyed Jacks (1961)

Rank Organisation

 An Alligator Named Daisy (1955)
 Doctor at Sea (1955)
 Simon and Laura (1955)
 The Battle of the River Plate (1956)
 The Black Tent (1956)
 House of Secrets (1956)
 The Spanish Gardener (1956)
 Doctor at Large (1957)
 Hell Drivers (1957)
 Ill Met by Moonlight (1957)
 The Big Money (1958)

Other studios

 Richard III (London Films, 1955)
 Away All Boats (Universal Pictures, 1956)
 High Society (Metro-Goldwyn-Mayer, 1956)
 The Searchers (Warner Bros., 1956)
 The Pride and the Passion (United Artists, 1957)
 North by Northwest (Metro-Goldwyn-Mayer, 1959)
 The Day the Earth Froze (American International Pictures, 1964)
 Death by Hanging (Japan, 1968)
 In the Realm of the Senses (Japan, 1976)
 In the Realm of Passion (Japan, 1978)
 Lupin III: The Mystery of Mamo (Japan, 1978) 
 Vengeance Is Mine (Japan, 1979)
 Urusei Yatsura 2: Beautiful Dreamer (Japan, 1984)
 Wings of Honneamise (Japan, 1987)
 Venus Wars (Japan, 1989)
 The End of Evangelion (Japan, 1997)

Films using VistaVision for special effects process work only

 Star Wars (1977)
 Star Trek: The Motion Picture (1979)
 The Empire Strikes Back (1980)
 Caveman (1981)
 The Fox and the Hound (1981, CG-like animation, uncredited)
 Tron (1982)
 Star Trek II: The Wrath of Khan (1982)
 Return of the Jedi (1983)
 Back to the Future (1985)
 Aliens (1986)
 RoboCop (1987)
 Coming to America (1988)
 Who Framed Roger Rabbit (1988)
 Back to the Future Part II (1989)
 The Abyss (1989)
 Indiana Jones and the Last Crusade (1989)
 Back to the Future Part III (1990)
 Jurassic Park (film) (1993)
 Forrest Gump (1994)
 True Lies (1994)
 Apollo 13 (1995)
 Jumanji (1995)
 Twister (1996)
 The Lost World: Jurassic Park (1997)
 Contact (1997)
 Men in Black (1997)
 Meet Joe Black (1998)
 The Matrix (1999)
 The Mummy (1999)
 Gladiator (2000)
 The Perfect Storm (2000)
 Pearl Harbor (2001)
 The Mummy Returns (2001)
 Jurassic Park III (2001)
 Spider-Man (2002)
 Men in Black II (2002)
 2 Fast 2 Furious (2003)
 Spider-Man 2 (2004)
 Batman Begins (2005)
 Herbie: Fully Loaded (2005)
 Flightplan (2005)
 Spider-Man 3 (2007)
 The Dark Knight (2008)
 Blindness (2008)
 Watchmen (2009)
 Inception (2010)
 Scott Pilgrim vs. The World (2010)
 Harry Potter and the Deathly Hallows Parts 1 & 2 (2010/2011)
 The Dark Knight Rises (2012)
 Captain Phillips (2013)
 Interstellar (2014)
 Spectre (2015)
  Jurassic World Dominion (2022)

References 

VistaVision